Viet Cuong (born 1990 in West Hills, California) is a Vietnamese-American composer. Praised as "alluring" by The New York Times and "irresistible" by The San Francisco Chronicle, Cuong's music has been performed in venues such as Carnegie Hall, Lincoln Center, and the Kennedy Center. His music has been commissioned and performed by organizations such as the New York Philharmonic, So Percussion, Alarm Will Sound, Eighth Blackbird, Saint Paul Chamber Orchestra, Albany Symphony Orchestra, PRISM Saxophone Quartet, and The Crossing.

Biography 
Cuong was born in West Hills, California, and grew up in Marietta, GA, where he graduated from Lassiter High School.  He credits his high school band program for helping him find both a love of music and sense of belonging. He studied music composition at the Peabody Institute, Princeton University, and Curtis Institute of Music.  His mentors include Kevin Puts, Oscar Bettison, Donnacha Dennehy, Steven Mackey, Jennifer Higdon, David Ludwig, Richard Danielpour.

Cuong serves on the music composition faculty at the University of Nevada, Las Vegas and is the current Young American Composer-in-Residence of the California Symphony.

References

External links

American composers
1990 births
Living people